The Dorais Velodrome is an abandoned outdoor velodrome in Dorais Park in Detroit, Michigan, USA. It was built in 1969 for $50,000 with mostly volunteer labor by the Michigan Bicycling Federation. The site was donated by the City of Detroit. The track is a one-fifth mile banked concrete track. It officially opened in late-July 1969 prior to the National Bicycle Racing Championships.

Numerous races and bicycle training classes were held on the track between 1969 and 1989. These were typically organized by the Wolverine Sports Club and the Detroit Recreation Department.

The track deteriorated over time making it no longer suitable for track racing. In 1993, the City of Detroit held a public hearing for a replacement track. In 1997, the cost to rebuild the track was estimated at $700,000 according to John Jones of the Detroit Recreation Department. By then, plans were then underway to build an outdoor velodrome at Bloomer Park in Rochester Hills, Michigan.

References

Sports venues in Detroit
Velodromes in the United States
Defunct sports venues in Michigan
1969 establishments in Michigan
Sports venues completed in 1969
Cycling in Detroit